Audacy, Inc. is an American broadcasting company based in Philadelphia, Pennsylvania. Founded in 1968 as Entercom Communications Corporation, it is the second largest radio company in the United States, owning 235 radio stations across 48 media markets.

In November 2017, the company merged with CBS Radio. The transaction was structured as an exchange offer whereby owners of CBS Corporation common shares (i.e., not the multiple-voting shares held by National Amusements) at the time of the merger could elect to exchange their shares for Entercom shares corresponding to a 72% stake in the combined company.

History

Joseph M. Field founded the company as Entertainment Communications (which would later be shortened to Entercom) on October 21, 1968, on the conviction that FM broadcasting, then in its infancy, would eventually surpass AM broadcasting as the leading radio broadcast band.

During the 1990s, the Federal Communications Commission's regulations on the ownership of multiple radio stations were eased, beginning with the introduction of duopoly rules, which allowed a company to own two stations in each radio market. Entercom took advantage of the change to expand its presence in the markets where it already operated.  In April 1995, the company paid $24.5 million for three stations in Portland, Oregon, acquiring KGON, a classic rock station; KFXX, an all-sports station; and KMUZ-FM, a modern rock station.

In January 1999, Entercom went public in an IPO in which it raised around $236 million. In July 1999, the company purchased 43 radio stations from Sinclair Broadcast Group for $821.5 million in cash. It was Entercom's largest deal to date. The deal included stations in eight markets, Kansas City, Missouri; Milwaukee; New Orleans; Memphis, Tennessee; Buffalo, New York; Norfolk, Virginia; and Scranton/Wilkes-Barre, Pennsylvania. The deal more than doubled both the number of stations under the company's control, and the number of markets in which it had stations. The acquisition made Entercom the fifth-largest radio broadcaster in the United States, with 88 stations in 17 markets. That year, Entercom announced that it would direct its radio stations not to play songs that promoted violence.

On August 21, 2006, Entercom agreed to buy 15 mid-market stations from CBS Radio. Locations included Austin, Texas; Cincinnati; Memphis, Tennessee; and Rochester, New York. Due to ownership limitations set by the FCC, Entercom had to sell three of its stations in the Rochester market; these were acquired by Stephens Media Group.  Shortly after the transaction, the company exited the Cincinnati market by trading all four of its stations in Cincinnati and three of its stations in Seattle in exchange for three stations in San Francisco in a deal with Bonneville International.  A year later, Entercom was investigated for payola and fined $4.45 million by the FCC.

In 2007, Entercom station KDND was sued after a participant in a "Hold Your Wee For a Wii" contest held by the station's morning show died of water intoxication.

In May 2014, Entercom announced its launch of SmartReach Digital product line focused on creating digital marketing options for small and medium businesses.

On December 8, 2014, Entercom announced its acquisition of Lincoln Financial Media for $105 million; the deal gave the company 14 additional stations in Atlanta; Denver; Miami; and San Diego. To comply with FCC ownership limits in the Denver market and DOJ antitrust concerns, Entercom entered into an exchange agreement with Bonneville under which Entercom exchanged four stations in Denver for classic rock station KSWD in Los Angeles and $5 million in additional consideration. The stations Entercom exchanged with Bonneville were KOSI-FM, KYGO-FM, KKFN-FM and KEPN-AM. Entercom previously owned KOSI-FM, while the remaining stations were acquired through the acquisition of LFM.

Entercom and Bonneville began operating the exchanged stations under time brokerage agreement (TBAs) once the LFM transaction was completed. In November 2015, the swap deal was closed successfully.

In October 2016, Entercom announced that it would acquire four radio stations in Charlotte, North Carolina, from Beasley Broadcast Group for $24 million in cash. The deal closed in January 2017 and WBT AM/FM, WLNK-FM and WFNZ-AM joined Entercom.

Richard J. Schmaeling became Executive Vice President and Chief Financial Officer on April 18, 2017. In May 2017, Mike Dee joined the company in a newly created position as President of Sports.

On August 3, 2017, Entercom announced the purchase of a 45% stake in Cadence13 (formerly DGital Media), a startup that handles ad sales and distribution for podcasts, including Pod Save America, Recode Decode and The Tony Kornheiser Show.

On Suicide Prevention Day in 2017 Entercom launched “I’m Listening,” a program dedicated to ending the stigma of talking about Mental Health.

On June 25, 2018, Entercom announced that Radio.com would become the exclusive streaming provider for all of its stations, beginning with its legacy stations on July 6, and former CBS Radio stations beginning August 1, ending its relationship with the third-party service TuneIn. All Entercom properties were also branded on-air as "A Radio.com station".

Following the termination of its deal with United States Traffic Network, Entercom launched an internal Traffic Weather and Information Network (TWIN) in August 2018.

In September 2018, Entercom's social responsibility platform Entercom Serves began in order to focus on important issues in the communities the company serves including children’s health, diversity, civic education, the environment, mental health and the military community. Later that year,  Entercom launched CHANNEL Q, an LGBTQ+ Talk Radio Network providing LGBTQ+ news and information, pop culture and new music.

In February 2019 Radio.com Sports was created, featuring appearances from experts on Entercom sports stations across the country. Mercedes-Benz was the first sponsor to sign on as a brand partner.

On February 13, 2019, Entercom announced that it would trade its Indianapolis cluster (WNTR, WXNT, and WZPL) to Cumulus Media for WNSH (now WXBK) in New York City, WMAS-FM in Enfield, Connecticut, and WHLL in Springfield, Massachusetts. Both companies began operating their newly acquired stations via LMA on March 1; the swap was completed on May 13, 2019.

In April 2019, Entercom reached a distribution agreement with Waze, giving drivers the ability to access Radio.com's podcasts and on-demand audio content through Waze.

On August 19, 2019, Entercom launched the Radio.com Sports Digital Network, a collection of daily live audio and video programming from the company’s sports stations. Later that month, Paul Suchman became the company’s Chief Marketing Officer.

In September 2019, Entercom partnered with Apple to integrate its news, sports and music stations into the Apple iOS13 software and soon after, the company expanded RADIO.COM’s accessibility onto Samsung’s Bixby marketplace.

Early in 2020, Entercom opened an HD Radio Sound Space in Los Angeles as an event space and home for future live events. The space was opened with a live performance from Coldplay.

In response to the COVID-19 pandemic, Entercom developed the Stay Connected programming that included "Heroes & Difference Makers," and "Love Local," and “I'm Listening: Stay Connected," a daily digital series on mental health hosted by "LOVELINE"'s Dr. Chris Donaghue.

In September 2020 Clark Atlanta University partnered with Entercom, to give Mass Media Arts Students at the university access to company representatives in programming, sales, digital, and on-air talent.

On October 21, 2020, Entercom announced a partnership with the National Urban League to advance racial justice and equity in the communities they serve.

In 2020, Radio.com established partnerships with SoundHound Inc  and Beasley Media Group.

Also in 2020, streaming platform Twitch added the video feeds from a number of Radio.com's sports stations with branded channels and GM added Radio.com to their in-dash application in Chevrolet, GMC, Buick, and Cadillac vehicles.

In March 2021, Entercom acquired podcast ad network Podcorn in a deal valued at $22.5 million. The company also reached a long-term licensing agreement with Global Music Rights (GMR), allowing the company to perform all of the songs from songwriters and publishers represented by the performance rights organization.

On March 30, 2021, after more than 50 years as Entercom, the company rebranded as Audacy to clarify its position as a scaled multi-platform audio content and entertainment company. The Radio.com name was also rebranded as the Audacy app. On the same day, Audacy and BetMGM agreed to a multi-year deal designating the sports betting and gaming platform as the preferred sports betting partner with Audacy.

Merger with CBS Radio 
On February 2, 2017, Entercom announced that it had agreed to merge with CBS Radio. The purchase will give Entercom operations in 23 of the top 25 markets, and make it the second-largest owner of radio stations in the US, behind iHeartMedia. Under the terms of the Reverse Morris Trust, the company would retain the Entercom name, board of directors and base of operations, but CBS shareholders would hold 72% of its stock. The company also shut down KDND in Sacramento and returned its license to the FCC, with its programming moved to sister station KUDL. The FCC had designated that the renewal of KDND's license would be subject to a hearing over allegations it had failed to operate in the public interest.

On September 26, 2017, KSOQ-FM, WGGI and KSWD were sold to the Educational Media Foundation. KSWD and WGGI affiliated with the EMF's K-Love Christian music network, and KSOQ with its Air1 network.

To comply with federal ownership caps, Entercom stated that it would divest at least 15 stations. On November 1, 2017, Entercom announced a settlement with the Department of Justice, which allowed their merger with CBS Radio. The company also announced a series of asset exchange agreements with iHeartMedia and Beasley Broadcast Group in Boston, Seattle, Richmond and Chattanooga; and local marketing agreements with Bonneville International Corporation in San Francisco and Sacramento.

On November 9, 2017, the FCC gave the final approval needed for the Entercom merger by granting two 6-month waivers for market station limits in Miami and San Francisco. The merger occurred at midnight on November 17, 2017. Later that day, Entercom would switch WBMP in New York to alternative. This would then be followed up by WJMK in Chicago's switch to classic hip-hop and KVIL in Dallas-Ft. Worth's flip to alternative. The company also introduced a new corporate logo as well as other corporate strategy changes. The Entercom Divestiture Trust then entered into agreements with Bonneville International to operate its stations on their behalf.

Shortly afterward, the company announced renewed radio broadcasting partnerships with the Minnesota Twins and Philadelphia Eagles. The company also has partnerships with additional professional teams including the New York Yankees, Boston Red Sox, Dallas Cowboys and Detroit Red Wings.

On July 19, 2018, Entercom announced that it would acquire Philadelphia market-leader WBEB from Jerry Lee Radio for $57.5 million. WXTU was divested back to its previous owner, Beasley Broadcast Group, to comply with ownership limits.

On August 3, 2018, Entercom announced that Bonneville would buy all eight stations for $141 million, which the company had been operating under LMA since after the merger with CBS Radio. The deal was completed on September 21, 2018.

Sports betting 
On September 3, 2019, Entercom’s RADIO.COM Sports signed a content distribution partnership with sports betting content platform The Action Network that will include updates on Entercom Sports format stations and podcasts on RADIO.COM.

In late 2020, Entercom expanded into sports betting with a six-year partnership to make FanDuel its official sportsbook. As part of the deal, FanDuel promotions and betting odds would be aired on Entercom stations. The gaming brand would also have access to Entercom talent in markets where both companies operate.

Just weeks after announcing a partnership with FanDuel, Entercom acquired sports data and iGaming affiliate platform QL Gaming Group in an all-cash deal for approximately $32 million. Following the acquisition of QL Gaming Group, Entercom launched “BetQL Network” on RADIO.COM on January 25, 2021. The network serves as home for the company’s sports betting content from its sports stations nationwide and is currently available over-the-air in several markets nationwide and digitally via the Audacy app.

In March 2021, Entercom and Rush Street Interactive (RSI) reached a multi-year partnership surrounding several sports betting audio initiatives. As part of this agreement, BetRivers, RSI’s flagship brand and online sportsbook, will be the official title sponsor of Radio.com’s You Better You Bet podcast.

Businesses

Radio 

On March 30, 2021, Entercom rebranded as Audacy. With this rebranding, all Audacy stations are identified at the top of each hour as "An Audacy station."

Digital

Audacy app (formerly Radio.com) 

As part of the company's merger with CBS Radio, Entercom acquired Radio.com, Eventful, and play.it.

The Audacy app, formerly known as Radio.com, is an integrated digital platform offering over 230 locally programmed radio stations and their websites. Audacy currently has over 1,000 stations from more than 100 markets

On April 23, 2020, Radio.com streams were added to Sonos Radio, available in over 10 million homes globally. A week later, Radio.com was added to Comcast televisions. 

The entire lineup of Locked On podcasts was added to Radio.com on February 10, 2021, following a content distribution partnership.

The Radio.com app became the Audacy app when the company rebranded on March 30, 2021.

Podcasting 
Audacy’s podcast network include Cadence13, Pineapple Street Media, and Podcorn. The network is one of the largest podcast platforms in the country (3000 podcasts) with an ever-expanding roster. The network has garnered over two billion downloads, including 30 million monthly unique listeners.

In 2019, Entercom announced its acquisition of Pineapple Street Media, a podcast producer, and the remaining portion of Cadence13. In 2021, Entercom acquired podcast ad network Podcorn, a deal valued at $22.5 million.

Cadence13 

Cadence13, a division of Audacy, is a podcast studio based out of New York City. David Landau, Spencer Brown and Chris Corcoran founded Cadence13 as DGital Media alongside Michael Rolnick, a venture capitalist, in 2015. In 2017, Entercom purchased a 45 percent stake in DGital Media for $9.7 million and the company changed its name to Cadence13. Co-founder Chris Corcoran is Chief Content Officer and John Murphy is President.

The company has produced podcasts for Pulitzer Prize-winning historian and author Jon Meacham and NBA star Kevin Durant.

Pineapple Street Studios 

Pineapple Street Studios is a podcast studio based in Brooklyn, New York. Originally named Pineapple Street Media, the company was founded in 2016 by former BuzzFeed head of audio Jenna Weiss-Berman and Longform co-founder Max Linsky. In August 2019, Pineapple Street was acquired by Entercom and renamed Pineapple Street Studios.

Podcorn 
Podcorn facilitates podcast ad campaigns and enables direct podcasters and advertisers to have direct relationships. Using algorithms, it matches podcasters to the most relevant brands.

The platform was founded by Agnes Kozera and David Kierzkowski following the acquisition by Google of their previous company FameBit, the leading marketplace for video influencers where brands and YouTube stars collaborated for branded content.

Live experiences 
Each year, Audacy operates many live events, including The Night Before, We Can Survive, Not So Silent Night, Riptide and Stars & Strings in various cities throughout the country.

References

External links
 

 
Companies listed on the New York Stock Exchange
Companies based in Philadelphia
Radio broadcasting companies of the United States
Mass media companies established in 1968
American companies established in 1968
1968 establishments in Pennsylvania
1999 initial public offerings